World of Sport Wrestling (frequently shortened to WOS Wrestling) was a British professional wrestling television series and occasional promotion. It was promoted as a re-launch of the popular wrestling segment of the World of Sport sports programme which ran on ITV between 2 January 1965 and 28 September 1985. The programme was launched on New Year's Eve 2016. It was formerly associated with the United States-based promotion, Impact Wrestling. A six-date live tour of the show's stars took place in January/February 2019.

History

Background
ITV transmitted British professional wrestling for over 33 years from November 1955 to December 1988. The bulk of this was screened on Saturday afternoons or lunchtimes (although other slots including midweek late evenings, midweek lunchtimes and bank holiday Monday afternoons were also used). Throughout World of Sport lifetime, the Saturday afternoon coverage was generally incorporated into the package show as a slot. Joint Promotions held exclusive rights to ITV television coverage until the end of 1986 when they rotated with tapings of All Star Wrestling and occasional WWF special editions.

Despite the cancellation, professional wrestling in the distinct British style has continued in the United Kingdom to the present day. Additionally, since the early 1990s, a second strand of wrestling promotions has emerged, producing more American-styled shows. The two genres have become known commonly as "Old School" and "New School", respectively, after the names used in an invasion angle run by the FWA promotion around 2001. Over the years, numerous attempts were made to relaunch televised British wrestling, with various promotions covered on a single local ITV franchise or satellite/digital channels and often touted as the "revival" of British Wrestling. Although ITV screened WCW in the early hours and from 1992 to 1995 in British wrestling's old Saturday afternoon slot, no homegrown promotion ever received regular syndicated coverage on the network.

In the 21st century, vintage ITV coverage was repeated as World of Sport on digital channels such as The Wrestling Channel and Men and Movies, resulting in the name "World of Sport" becoming a frequent retronym for the Traditional/Old-school style.

Development and pilots
The mid-2010s saw an increasing drive to return British Wrestling to ITV. A pilot for World of Sport Wrestling (branding itself as a direct revival of the old slot on the World of Sport programme) was filmed at the Fairfield Halls, Croydon in 2013 but rejected by ITV. This was eventually posted to YouTube in mid-2015.

On 17 October 2016, ITV announced that they would be bringing back professional wrestling and would be recording another pilot episode on 1 November 2016, being filmed at dock10 studios in Greater Manchester. The show featured independent wrestlers such as El Ligero, Grado and Sha Samuels. ITV also announced that former WWE commentator Jim Ross would commentate on the pilot episode. It aired on New Year's Eve on ITV. A storyline running through the show was Grado's quest for the WOS championship, falling short in his match with Dave Mastiff to become inaugural champion before eventually winning the belt in a rematch at the end of the broadcast.

The following year, on 23 March, Impact Wrestling announced that they would be teaming with ITV to yet again bring back the show with Jeff Jarrett as an executive producer for a ten-episode series. The show was announced to be scheduled for taping at Preston Guild Hall on 25 and 26 May. Impact Wrestling talents such as Grado, Rockstar Spud and Magnus along with independent wrestlers such as El Ligero, Dave Mastiff and Sha Samuels, were confirmed to be part of the roster. The tapings were cancelled in April, and were eventually rescheduled for 2018.

Series 1
On 25 April 2018, ITV announced World of Sport would air as a ten part series later in the year on Saturday afternoons. The shows were taped at Epic Studios in Norwich, on May 10, 11 and 12 and broadcast from July 28 until September 29 on ITV and STV. Jim Ross was not involved and neither was Impact Wrestling. Instead, the hosts were Alex Shane and SoCal Val. The main storyline was the championship reign of Rampage and his pursuit by challenger Justin Sysum, the third man in the ring in Rampage's Triple Threat title win from Grado and denied the title in a controversial countout loss in episode 3 before defeating the champion in a tag match in episode 7 and then, in the final two episodes, earning himself a title shot and finally winning the belt. Other storylines saw the establishment of a women's championship and a Tag Team Championship tournament spread over six episodes. Also an ongoing story was Grado's running battles with disapproving WOS executive Stu Bennett. Other repeated characters included masked monster heel Crater, treacherous heel Martin Kirby and his former partner, singing babyface Joe Hendry.

2019 live tour 
At the conclusion of episode 6 (transmitted 1 September 2018) a six-date live tour of the show's stars was announced for January/February 2019. The WOS Women's Championship changed hands four times and Sysum made four defences of his WOS Championship against former champion Rampage. As Davey Boy Smith Jr. was not on the tour, the WOS Tag Team Championship was not defended.

Cancellation
Following ITV obtaining the rights to All Elite Wrestling in the UK, Dave Meltzer confirmed that WOS Wrestling had ended in late 2019, although this appeared to be disputed by the show's producers.

Programme sales
Broadcasting rights to the series were licensed in India to Discovery Communications-branded channel DSport. Series 1 was transmitted on Tuesday nights at 9pm from 26 February 2019.

In the United States, Series 1 was screened on Stadium on Sunday nights 7pm EST, starting 12 May 2019, the first ever purchase of a UK wrestling programme by a US television channel.

Awards
The programme received a nomination for Digital Content for the Royal Television Society's East Awards 2019.

Episodes

New Year's Eve 2016 special

Series 1

Championship reigns

WOS Championship

WOS Tag Team Championship

WOS Women's Championship

Alumni 
Wrestlers and other personal that left the company before and after the company ended.

See also

List of professional wrestling promotions in Great Britain and Ireland
List of professional wrestling television series

References

External links

https://www.fite.tv/vl/p/wosw/

2016 British television series debuts
Professional wrestling television series
British professional wrestling promotions
ITV (TV network) original programming
2010s British sports television series
Defunct brands